Christian Neidhart (born 1 October 1968) is a German football manager and former player who manages Waldhof Mannheim. He is the father of fellow footballer Nico Neidhart.

Managerial statistics

References

1968 births
Living people
Sportspeople from Braunschweig
German footballers
Association football forwards
Eintracht Braunschweig players
Wacker 04 Berlin players
VfL Osnabrück players
FC Sachsen Leipzig players
BV Cloppenburg players
VfB Oldenburg players
DDR-Oberliga players
2. Bundesliga players
German football managers
3. Liga managers
VfB Oldenburg managers
SV Wilhelmshaven managers
SV Meppen managers
Rot-Weiss Essen managers
SV Waldhof Mannheim managers
Footballers from Lower Saxony
German expatriate footballers
German expatriate sportspeople in China
Expatriate footballers in China
West German footballers